Aloma Wright (born March 10, 1950) is an American actress, widely known for her roles as Laverne Roberts on the NBC/ABC comedy series Scrubs (2001–2009), Maxine Landis on the NBC daytime drama series Days of Our Lives (2008–2015), Mildred Clemons on the ABC drama series Private Practice (2011–2013),  Gretchen Bodinski on the USA Network drama series Suits (2015–2019), and Viola in Tyler Perry's Young Dylan.

Early life
Wright was born in New York and raised in California. She attended the American Academy of Dramatic Arts in New York City.

Career 
Wright began her acting career on stage, before appearing in films like Stuart Saves His Family, Devil in the Flesh, and Shadow Hours, and television shows such as Suddenly Susan, Dangerous Minds, Frasier, Friends, Malcolm in the Middle, Ally McBeal, Girlfriends, and Judging Amy. She also had a recurring role in the Fox series Power Rangers in Space in 1998. She was in the Steve Harvey show as coach Cedric's mother.

In 2001, Wright was cast as Laverne Roberts in the NBC comedy series, Scrubs. After six seasons, her character was killed off in "My Long Goodbye". She returned in season seven playing a new character, Nurse Shirley. Initial reports stated that her character would be the alcoholic, irreligious sister of Laverne, but these turned out to be inaccurate. She later returned to play Nurse Roberts in the season 8 finale, "My Finale", as JD is looking back on all the people in his life. In 2000s, Wright also guest starred on NYPD Blue, Cold Case, NCIS, and Mad Men. She also had supporting parts in films such as Bring It On, The Brothers, Mr. Deeds and Johnson Family Vacation.

In 2008, Wright began appearing as nurse Maxine Landis in the NBC daytime soap opera, Days of Our Lives. From 2012 to 2013, Wright also had the recurring role as Mildred Clemons in the Shonda Rhimes' series, Private Practice, and in 2015 appeared in an episode of Scandal. In 2015, she joined the cast of USA Network legal series Suits for season five as Harvey Specter’s new secretary, Gretchen Bodinski. She appeared on the show in a recurring basis until the series finale aired in 2019. In 2020, she was cast as Viola, the title character's grandmother in the Nickelodeon sitcom Young Dylan created by Tyler Perry.

Filmography

Film

Television

References

External links 
 

1950 births
African-American actresses
American film actresses
American television actresses
American soap opera actresses
Actresses from New York City
Living people
American Academy of Dramatic Arts alumni
20th-century American actresses
21st-century American actresses
20th-century African-American women
21st-century African-American women
21st-century African-American people